The Moravian Karst is a karst landscape and protected landscape area to the north of Brno in the South Moravian Region of the Czech Republic. It encompasses a number of notable geological features, including roughly 1100 caverns and gorges and covers an area of roughly 92 km². Currently, five of the cave systems (Punkva Caves (discovered by Karel Absolon), Balcarka Cave, Kateřinská Cave, Výpustek Cave and Sloupsko-šošůvské Caves+Kůlna Cave) are open for public tours; another - Amatérská Cave, Býčí skála Cave or Stránská skála (out of the border) only for science exploration.

This region is also home to one of the most important single geological features in the Czech Republic, the Macocha Abyss, a gorge 138 m deep, which was formed when the ceiling of a cave chamber collapsed. Macocha Abyss is also the place where the Punkva River begins to run underground through the Punkva cave system, and two small pools of water are visible at the surface.

The Moravian Karst is a popular tourist attraction in the local area, and large numbers of tourists visit in the summer months. In addition to caverns, the protected landscape area contains well-marked bicycle trails and hiking paths to explore.

See also 
 Punkva Caves
 Macocha Gorge
 Výpustek Cave
 Kůlna Cave
 Býčí skála Cave
 Amatérská Cave
 Stránská skála
 Brno Highlands
 Jindřich Wankel
 Karel Absolon

References

External links
 Moravian Karst Show Caves Administration (English)
 Blansko town site with tourism information
 Information on the caves from showcaves.com

Landforms of the Czech Republic
Caves of the Czech Republic
Limestone caves
Show caves in the Czech Republic
Tourist attractions in the Czech Republic
Karst
Canyons and gorges of Europe